The Czechoslovakian Small Riding Pony is a breed of pony, used as a riding animal for children.

History
Development of this small riding pony began in 1980 at the Agricultural University in Nitra. The initial breeding stock, about seventy mares, were kept at the Nová Bana farm.

Broodmares were selected mostly of Arabian stock and also included Hanoverian, Slovak Warmblood and Hucul. A herd of twenty-seven mares averaging 14.2 hands were selected for the first crosses to a Welsh pony stallion, Branco. The first offspring, foaled in 1981, were kept outdoors on the rough terrain. Additional crosses were made to another Welsh stallion, Shal, imported from West Germany. The first foals were trained under saddle and in harness in 1984 and nearly all successfully passed the working trials. Animals of the new breed are docile, with an alert but calm temperament, modest in feeding requirement and effective in utilization of food. They have good gaits and jumping ability. They stand between 13.2 and 13.3 hands high.

In 1989 a conference was held at the Agricultural University of Nitra regarding the breeding programme. It was agreed that methods being used to breed a small sport horse for children from the ages of eight to sixteen years were correct and that efforts should be continued.

There are now over 150 of these new breed of ponies, and plans are being made to establish a club for private breeders of small horses in Nitra.

References

 Hendricks, Bonnie. International Encyclopedia of Horse Breeds, page 146. University of Oklahoma Press. 2007. .

Horse breeds
Horse breeds originating in Slovakia